Bonnie Comley is an American three-time Tony Award-winning theatre producer. She has won an Olivier Award and two Drama Desk Awards for her stage productions. She is a member of The Broadway League and serves on their Audience Engagement and Education Committee.

Career
After graduating from Emerson College, Comley was hired as a reporter, and on-camera host for NightLife Tv on The Travel Channel. Comley began pursuing an acting career in the 1990s, appearing in commercials for Budweiser, Crystal Light and Pizza Hut.

In 2013, Bonnie Comley co-founded BroadwayHD.

Charitable work 
Comley has created scholarships funds at Columbia University Business Graduate School and at the Boston University College of Fine Arts Undergraduate School, where a theater is named in her honor. She is also major supporter of the University of Massachusetts Lowell, where another theater is named in her honor, and at Emerson College where the Musical Theater Society Room bears her name.  She is also a supporter of Fiorello H. La Guardia High School for the Performing Arts School with her husband Stewart F. Lane.

On May 7, 2007, the 500 seat Comley/Lane Theater opened at the University of Massachusetts Lowell.

Personal life
Comley is married to fellow producer Stewart F. Lane and they live in NYC.

Notable productions

As producer

As actor

Boards and associations
The Drama League Board of Directors ( 2009–present)
Emerson College Board of Advisors (2003–present)
Diller-Quaile School of Music Board of Directors  (2002-2011)
The Theatre Museum Board of Advisors  (2002–present)

References

External links
 Bonnie Comley's official site
Bonnie Comley's bio
Bonnie Comley photos
Rob Rich photos of Bonnie Comley on SocietyAllure.com
Patrick McMullan photos of Bonnie Comley
 
All About Me Opening
Come Fly Away Opening

Emerson College alumni
Tony Award winners
American stage actresses
American theatre managers and producers
Year of birth missing (living people)
Living people
21st-century American women